Gary A. LaBranche, FASAE, CAE, is the CEO of The Risk and Insurance Management Society.

Career
Gary LaBranche is the CEO of The Risk and Insurance Management Society, Inc. (RIMS) effective June 1, 2022.  RIMS is a professional association serving approximately 10,000 risk management professionals in over 60 countries.

Formerly, he was president and CEO of the National Investor Relations Institute (NIRI).https://www.niri.org/contact-us NIRI's 3500 members include investor relations practitioners from 1600+ publicly traded companies with combined market valuation of $9 trillion. Prior to joining NIRI in 2017, he was President & CEO of the Association for Corporate Growth (2008-2017) and President & CEO of the Association Forum (2003-2008).

Named an ASAE Fellow (FASAE) in 1995, he received the ASAE Key Award in 2007 for his career achievement as an association CEO. Association Trends named him the Association Executive of the Year for 2012, for which he presented remarks entitled, "Four Freedoms of Association."

The Association Forum named him the recipient of the 2019 Samuel B. Shapiro Award for Chief Executive Achievement, the Forum's highest award for association CEOs. https://s6.goeshow.com/af/honorsgala/2019/honorees-2019.cfm He has been a member of the U.S. Chamber's Committee of 100 since 2004. LaBranche also served three years as CEO of CertiLearn, an e-learning company.

He was the 2013–2014 Board Chairman for ASAE's for-profit subsidiary, ASAE Business Services, Inc., and served on that board 2008–2018. LaBranche also served on the 2013–2014 ASAE Board of Directors and is a past member of the ASAE Foundation Board and the ASAE Insurance Company Board.

With his wife, Karen LaBranche, Gary is a producer of small independent movies, including “THE OTHERKIND,” a science fiction horror film directed by Mary C. Russell set for 2022 release. 

He has served two terms on the Vestry of St. Matthew's Episcopal Church in Evanston, IL. He attended Lorain County Community College and graduated from The Ohio State University.

In the media
He is the author of more than 350 columns, podcasts and articles on association management. 
LaBranche has given over 350 presentations and consulted on strategic planning and management with over 300 associations around the world.
LaBranche was profiled as an innovative leader in the book Hope: How Triumphant Leaders Create The Future by Andrew Razeghi.
LaBranche authored Perspectives on the Future of Association Trade Shows and Exhibits (The leadership edge series).
 LaBranche authored a chapter in "ASAE's Handbook on Professional Practices in Association Management," 3rd Edition (2015), "Managing the Complex Association Enterprise. https://www.asaecenter.org/publications/108241-asae-handbook-of-professional-practices-in-association-management-3rd-edition
LaBranche is the author of "The Association CEO Succession Toolkit" (2018), published by ASAE Association Management Press. .

Personal life
LaBranche lives with his wife, Karen and daughter Catie, in Evanston, IL. An active volunteer, LaBranche led Tau Kappa Epsilon International Fraternity as Grand Prytanis (International Chairman) from 1997–1999 and presided over the Fraternity's Centennial Celebration.

Notes

Living people
American chief executives
1958 births